In the run up to the 2022 Slovenian parliamentary election, various organizations carried out opinion polling to gauge voting intention in Slovenia. Results of such polls are displayed in this article. The date range for these opinion polls are from the 2018 Slovenian parliamentary election, held on 3 June, to the present day. The next parliamentary election was held on 24 April 2022.

Pollsters 
There are three opinion research companies that conduct electoral opinion polling on a regular basis within Slovenia:

 Mediana, separately conducting electoral public opinion polls for the Slovene daily newspaper Delo, and the Slovene television channel POP TV and its respective multimedia web portal 24ur.com;
 Ninamedia, jointly published by the Slovene daily newspapers Dnevnik and Večer;
 Parsifal SC, which conducts opinion polling for the conservative news media enterprise Nova24TV.

Graphical summary 
The trendlines below are constructed using local regressions. The graph shows percentages of decided voters (whereas the list of polls shows percentages of all respondents).

Poll results 

Poll results are listed in the table in reverse chronological order, showing the most recent first. The highest figure in each survey is displayed in bold, and the background shaded in the leading party's colour. In the case of a tie, no figure is shaded. When available, seat projections for 88 out of 90 seats (without seats reserved for minorities) are displayed below the percentages in a smaller font. 46 seats are required for an absolute majority in the National Assembly. The dates of when the poll was conducted are given when available, otherwise, the date of publication is listed.

New parties and coalitions

Parties which ran in 2018

Scenarios 
In December 2021, Mediana asked for new parties and movements without publishing the results of all parties.

Other 
In late February 2021, falsified results from a 24ur Mediana poll were published and began to circulate on Twitter. The falsified image purported to show the tabulated results of a spiked poll that found pro-government parties in a comfortable lead. The falsified results were then shared by multiple politicians (including the prime minister). 24ur lodged a criminal complaint against the originator of the fabricated poll.

References

Opinion polling in Slovenia